In enzymology, an isopiperitenone Delta-isomerase is an enzyme that catalyzes the chemical reaction

isopiperitenone  piperitenone

Hence, this enzyme has one substrate, isopiperitenone, and one product, piperitenone.

This enzyme belongs to the family of isomerases, specifically those intramolecular oxidoreductases transposing C=C bonds.  The systematic name of this enzyme class is isopiperitenone Delta8-Delta4-isomerase.

References

 

EC 5.3.3
Enzymes of unknown structure